Gönyeli Spor Kulübü is a Turkish Cypriot professional football club based in Gönyeli, North Nicosia.

Colours
The club colours are red and white.

Stadium
The club's home stadium is Gönyeli Ali Naci Karacan Stadı, named for journalist Ali Naci Karacan.

However, they are currently playing their home games at the Atatürk Stadium in Nicosia.

Honors

Birinci Lig: (9)
 1971-72, 1977-78, 1980-81, 1992-93, 1994-95, 1998-99, 2000-01, 2007-08, 2008-09

Kıbrıs Kupası and Federasyon Kupası: (5)
 1985, 1995, 1998, 2000, 2008

Cumhurbaşkanlığı Kupası: (4)
 1985, 1995, 1999, 2000

References

Football clubs in Northern Cyprus
Football clubs in Nicosia